NeueHouse is a company that provides collaborative workspace, private offices, event and meeting space and a social scene for culture in New York and Los Angeles.

History
NeueHouse was founded in 2011 in New York by Joshua Abram, Alan Murray and James O'Reilly. Its first workspace, in New York, opened in May 2013. Additionally, NeueHouse published a hardcover print publication named NeueJournal. In the summer of 2015 the company raised $25 million venture funding by Great Eagle Holdings. In November 2018, NeueHouse raised $30 million from outside investors and hired new leadership.

Buildings

NeueHouse operates buildings in New York and Los Angeles. The New York building is located in 110 East 25th Street in Manhattan. In Los Angeles, NeueHouse leased the CBS Columbia Square building and opened in October 2015. In 2021 NeueHouse opened on the second floor of the Bradbury Building in Downtown Los Angeles.

Services

NeueHouse provides work, social and meeting space to small businesses and individual creative entrepreneurs, operating in the film, fashion, design, publishing and arts sectors. NeueHouse also organizes live events including content releases and cultural programming. For example, in 2021, the company held several movie premieres, occurring in the Los Angeles location. Membership at NeueHouse is by invitation only and its prices range from $200-$1,500 per month or with an annual Salon membership.

References

External links
NeueHouse website

American companies established in 2011
Companies based in New York City
2011 establishments in New York City